Cancer Wars was a six-part documentary that aired on PBS on May 25, 1998. The first episode discussed the history of cancer research such as contributions of epidemiologists at the University of Jena which were the first to document the link between cancer and smoking. The documentary discusses how US government tobacco interests prevented this evidence from coming to surface since tobacco was such an important US export. Cancer Wars delved into the pioneering work of Rachel Carson, whose book Silent Spring radically changed the world's thinking about chemicals and their effects on human health and the environment. Other episodes in this series discussed various topics ranging from the history of the advances in cancer therapy to the influence of Margaret Thatcher's neoliberal policies which cut funding to Anti-smoking campaigns in Britain because of interests in protecting British tobacco companies.

The documentary is based on Robert N. Proctor's 1995 book, Cancer Wars: How Politics Shapes What we Know and Don't Know About Cancer.

Episodes

See also
Agnotology
Merchants of Doubt

External links

1998 American television series debuts
1998 American television series endings
1990s American documentary television series
Television shows based on books